The 1942 New Mexico A&M Aggies football team was an American football team that represented New Mexico College of Agriculture and Mechanical Arts (now known as New Mexico State University) as a member of the Border Conference during the 1942 college football season.  In its third and final year under head coach Julius H. Johnston, the team compiled a 1–8 record (0–6 against conference opponents), finished in last place in the conference, and was outscored by a total of 223 to 33. The team played its home games at Quesenberry Field in Las Cruces, New Mexico.

Schedule

References

New Mexico AandM Aggies
New Mexico State Aggies football seasons
New Mexico AandM Aggies football